Parke Monroe Banta (November 21, 1891 – May 12, 1970) was a U.S. Representative from Missouri's 8th congressional district from 1947 to 1949.

Born in Berryman, Missouri, Banta attended the public schools, and William Jewell College at Liberty, Missouri.
He was graduated from Northwestern University Law School at Evanston-Chicago, Illinois, in 1914.
He was admitted to the bar in 1913 and practiced at Potosi, Missouri from 1914 to 1925 and at Ironton, Missouri from 1925 to 1941.
He served as prosecuting attorney of Washington County, Missouri, in 1917 and 1918.
During the First World War he served in the United States Army as a private and advanced through the ranks to first lieutenant from April 1918 to August 1919.
He served as a member of the board of trustees of Arcadia, Missouri, in 1928 and 1929.
He served as a member of Ironton-Arcadia School Board in 1932 and 1933.
Banta was the administrator of the Missouri State Social Security Commission 1941-1945.

Banta was elected as a Republican to the Eightieth Congress (January 3, 1947 – January 3, 1949).
He was an unsuccessful candidate for re-election in 1948 to the Eighty-first Congress and for election in 1950 to the Eighty-second Congress.
He resumed the practice of law in Ironton, Missouri.
He served as general counsel for Department of Health, Education, and Welfare, Washington, D.C., from April 11, 1953, until January 20, 1961.
He retired.
He died in Cape Girardeau, Missouri, May 12, 1970.
He was interred in New Masonic Cemetery, Potosi, Missouri.

References

External links

1891 births
1970 deaths
United States Army personnel of World War I
United States Army officers
Military personnel from Missouri
Missouri lawyers
School board members in Missouri
Republican Party members of the United States House of Representatives from Missouri
20th-century American politicians
Northwestern University Pritzker School of Law alumni
William Jewell College alumni
People from Ironton, Missouri
People from Washington County, Missouri
20th-century American lawyers